The Spider and the Rose is a 1923 American silent historical drama film directed by John McDermott and starring Alice Lake, Richard Headrick and Gaston Glass.

Cast
 Alice Lake as Paula
 Richard Headrick as Don Marcello, as a child
 Gaston Glass as Don Marcello
 Joseph J. Dowling as The Governor
 Robert McKim as Mendozza
 Noah Beery as Maître Renaud
 Otis Harlan as The Secretary
 Frank Campeau as Don Fernando
 Andrew Arbuckle as The Priest
 Alec B. Francis as Good Padre
 Edwin Stevens as Bishop Oliveros
 Louise Fazenda as Dolores

References

Bibliography
 Munden, Kenneth White. The American Film Institute Catalog of Motion Pictures Produced in the United States, Part 1. University of California Press, 1997.

External links
 

1923 films
1923 drama films
1920s English-language films
American silent feature films
Silent American drama films
American black-and-white films
Films directed by John McDermott
1920s American films